Patrick Keane (born 1952) is a Justice of the High Court of Australia and a former Chief Justice of the Federal Court of Australia.

Patrick Keane may also refer to:

 Patrick Keane (New Zealand judge), New Zealand judge, Chief Justice of the Cook Islands
 Patrick Keane (rower) (born 1997), Canadian rower
 Patrick Joseph James Keane (1872–1928), American Roman Catholic cleric, bishop of Sacramento
 Patrick Keane, American business executive, CEO of The Action Network

See also
 Patrick Kane (born 1988), American ice hockey player